

Winners and nominees

1980s

1990s

2000s

2010s

2020s

Records 
 Most awarded actress: Laura Zapata, Cynthia Klitbo, Diana Bracho, María Rubio, Itatí Cantoral, Chantal Andere, Daniela Romo, Rocío Banquells, Daniela Castro and Leticia Calderón, 2 times.
 Most nominated actress: Cynthia Klitbo with 8 nominations.
 Most nominated actresses without a win: Alma Muriel, Lilia Aragón, Úrsula Prats and Jacqueline Andere with 3 nominations.
 Αctresses have won all their nominations: Leticia Calderon, Daniela Romo, María Rubio, Rocio Banquells, and Itati Cantoral, 2 times. Claudia Martín and Sandra Echeverría, 1 time.
 Youngest winner: Itati Cantoral, 21 years old.
 Youngest nominee: Nailea Norvind, 20 years old.
 Oldest winner: Diana Bracho, 65 years old.
 Oldest nominee: Isabela Corona, 75 years old.
 Actress winning after short time:
Leticia Calderón by (En nombre del amor, 2010) and (Amor bravío, 2013), 3 years difference.
Daniela Castro by (Lo que la vida me robó, 2015) and (Me declaro culpable, 2018), 3 years difference.
 Actress winning after long time: Rocío Banquells by (Bianca Vidal, 1984) and (Cuando me enamoro, 2011), 27 years difference.
 Actresses that winning the award for the same role: Laura Zapata (María Mercedes, 1993) and Helena Rojo (Inocente de ti, 2004).
Actresses nominated for the same role without winning:
Beatriz Sheridan (Vivir un poco, 1985) and Jacqueline Andere (La madrastra, 2005)
Nailea Norvind (Cuando llega el amor, 1990) and Adamari López (Bajo las Riendas del Amor, 2007)
Azela Robinson (Cañaveral de pasiones, 1997) and Sabine Moussier (Abismo de pasión, 2013)
Karla Álvarez (La mentira, 1998) and Grettell Valdez (Lo imperdonable, 2015)
Foreign winning actresses:
 Sasha Montenegro from Italy
 Marjorie de Sousa from Venezuela
 Laura Carmine from Puerto Rico
 Azela Robinson from United Kingdom

References

External links 
TVyNovelas at esmas.com
TVyNovelas Awards at the univision.com

Antagonist
Awards for actresses